John Seymour may refer to:

Courtiers and politicians
 John Hayward (MP for Bridport) (c. 1355–1407), alias Seymour, member of parliament for Bridport, U.K.
 John Seymour (MP for Bristol) (fl. 1351), member of parliament for Bristol, U.K.
 John Seymour (1425–1463), British landowner and member of parliament
 John Seymour (died 1464), British knight and member of parliament
 John Seymour (died 1491) (1450s–1491), member of the British landed gentry and grandfather of Queen Jane Seymour
 Sir John Seymour (1474–1536), father of Queen Jane Seymour, third wife of Henry VIII of England
John Seymour (died 1567), member of parliament for Great Bedwyn, U.K.
John Seymour (died 1552), member of parliament for Wootton Bassett, U.K.
 John Seymour (died 1618), member of parliament for Great Bedwyn, U.K.
 John Seymour, 4th Duke of Somerset (before 1646–1675), British peer and member of parliament
 John Seymour (Maryland governor) (1649–1709), royal governor of the Maryland colony in the Americas, then part of England
 John Seymour (Gloucestershire MP) (died 1663), member of parliament for Gloucestershire
 John Seymour (California politician) (born 1937), senator from California, U.S.
 John Seymour, 19th Duke of Somerset (born 1952), British landowner and elected hereditary peer
 John Webb Seymour (1777–1819), English aristocrat and amateur geologist

Others
 John Seymour (priest) (died 1501), Canon of Windsor
 John Seymour (cricketer) (1881–1967), British cricketer
 John Laurence Seymour (1893–1986), American composer
 John Seymour (author) (1914–2004), British author and influential figure in the self-sufficiency movement

See also
 Seymour (disambiguation)
 Seymour (surname)